The 1973 New York Jets season was the fourteenth season for the team and the fourth in the National Football League. It began with the team trying to improve upon its 7–7 record from 1972 under head coach Weeb Ewbank. The Jets finished with a record of 4–10 in the final season under head coach Weeb Ewbank, with their only wins coming against division rivals New England and Baltimore.

The Jets' offense was weakened when quarterback Joe Namath suffered a shoulder injury in the second game. The injury was the third time in four seasons that Namath had been sidelined. Namath didn't play again until the second half of the tenth game of the season. 

The memorandum of understanding signed by team original owner (as the New York Titans) Harry Wismer gave Shea Stadium's co-tenants, the New York Mets’, exclusive use of the stadium until they had completed their season. The Jets were required to open 1973 with several road games. As the Mets had a long playoff run to the World Series, the Jets' first six games were on the road.

The 1973 season would be the last for legendary coach Weeb Ewbank.

Offseason

Roster

Regular season 

Schedule notes:
 The October 14 game vs. the Patriots was originally scheduled to be played in New York, but due to the New York Mets’ involvement in the World Series, the sites for that game and the November 11 rematch were switched.
 The October 21 game vs. the Steelers was originally scheduled to be played in New York, but was moved to Pittsburgh due to the Mets' ongoing participation in the World Series.

Season summary

Week 2

Week 5

Week 6 at Steelers

Standings

References 

Bibliography

Ryczek, William J. (2009). Crash of the Titans: The Early Years of the New York Jets and the AFL (revised ed.). Jefferson, North Carolina: McFarland & Co. .
Chastain, Bill (2010). 100 Things Jets Fans Should Know & Do Before They Die. Chicago: Triumph Books. .

External links 
 1973 statistics

New York Jets seasons
New York Jets
New York Jets season
1970s in Queens